is a Japanese word that describes people with consuming interests, particularly in anime, manga, video games, or computers.

 subculture is a central theme of various anime and manga works, documentaries and academic research. The subculture began in the 1980s as changing social mentalities and the nurturing of  traits by Japanese schools combined with the resignation of such individuals to what was then seen as inevitably becoming social outcasts. The subculture's birth coincided with the anime boom, after the release of works such as Mobile Suit Gundam before it branched into Comic Market. The  subculture continued to grow with the expansion of the internet and media, as more anime, video games, shows, and comics were created. The definition of  subsequently became more complex, and numerous classifications of  emerged. In 2005, the Nomura Research Institute divided  into twelve groups and estimated the size and market impact of each of these groups. Other institutions have split it further or focus on a single  interest. These publications classify distinct groups including anime, manga, camera, automobile, idol and electronics .

Etymology
 is derived from a Japanese term for another person's house or family (お宅). The word can be used metaphorically, as a part of honorific speech in Japanese as a second-person pronoun. In this usage, its literal translation is "you". It is associated with some dialects of Western Japanese and with housewives, and is less direct and more distant than intimate pronouns, such as anata, and masculine pronouns, such as kimi and omae.

The origin of the pronoun's use among 1980s manga/anime fans is unclear. Science fiction fans were using otaku to address owners of books by the late 1960s (in a sense of "Do[es] [your home] own this book?"). Social critic Eiji Ōtsuka posits that otaku was used because it allowed people meeting for the first time, such as at a convention, to interact from a comfortable distance. One theory posits that otaku was popularized as a pronoun by science fiction author Motoko Arai in a 1981 essay in Variety magazine, and another posits that it was popularized by fans of anime studio Gainax, some of whose founders came from Tottori Prefecture in western Japan (where otaku is commonly used). The pronoun was also used in the popular anime Macross, first aired in 1982, by the characters Hikaru Ichijyo and Lynn Minmay, who address each other as otaku until they get to know each other better.

The modern slang form, which is distinguished from the older usage by being written in hiragana (おたく), katakana (オタク or, less frequently, ヲタク) or rarely in rōmaji, first appeared in public discourse in the 1980s, through the work of humorist and essayist Akio Nakamori. His 1983 series , printed in the lolicon magazine Manga Burikko, applied the term as pejorative for "unpleasant" fans, attacking their supposed poor fashion sense and physical appearance in particular. Nakamori was particularly critical of "manga maniacs" oriented to cute girl characters, and explained his label otaku as the term of address used between junior high school kids at manga and anime conventions.

In 1989, the case of Tsutomu Miyazaki, "The Otaku Murderer", brought the fandom, very negatively, to national attention. Miyazaki, who randomly chose and murdered four girls, had a collection of 5,763 video tapes, some containing anime and slasher films that were found interspersed with videos and pictures of his victims. This publication has been claimed by scholar Rudyard Pesimo to have popularized the term.

Usage
In modern Japanese slang, the term  is mostly equivalent to "geek" or "nerd" (both in the broad sense; a technological geek would be ) and an academic nerd would be  or ), but in a more derogatory manner than used in the West. It is also applied to any fan of any particular theme, topic, hobby or form of entertainment. The word entered English as a loanword from the Japanese language. It is typically used to refer to a fan of anime/manga but can also refer to Japanese video games or Japanese culture in general. The American magazine Otaku USA popularizes and covers these aspects. The usage of the word is a source of contention among some fans, owing to its negative connotations and stereotyping of the fandom. Gunbuster was released officially in English in March 1990. The term's usage spread throughout the Usenet group rec.arts.anime with discussions about Otaku no Videos portrayal of  before its 1994 English release. Positive and negative aspects, including the pejorative usage, were intermixed. The term was also popularized by William Gibson's 1996 novel Idoru, which references .

Sub-culture
Morikawa Kaichirō identifies the subculture as distinctly Japanese, a product of the school system and society. Japanese schools have a class structure which functions as a caste system, but clubs are an exception to the social hierarchy. Secondly, the vertical structure of Japanese society identifies the value of individuals by their success. Until the late 1980s, unathletic and unattractive males focused on academics, hoping to secure a good job and marry to raise their social standing. Those unable to succeed socially focused instead on their interests, often into adulthood, with their lifestyle centering on those interests, furthering the creation of the  subculture.

Even prior to the coinage of the term, the stereotypical traits of the subculture were identified in a 1981 issue of Fan Rōdo (Fan road) about "culture clubs". These individuals were drawn to anime, a counter-culture, with the release of hard science fiction works such as Mobile Suit Gundam. These works allowed a congregation and development of obsessive interests that turned anime into a medium for unpopular students, catering to obsessed fans. After these fans discovered Comic Market, the term was used as a self-confirming and self-mocking collective identity.

The 1989 "Otaku Murderer" case gave a negative connotation to the fandom from which it has not fully recovered. The identification of  turned negative in late 2004 when Kaoru Kobayashi kidnapped, sexually assaulted, and murdered a seven-year-old first-grade student. Japanese journalist Akihiro Ōtani suspected that Kobayashi's crime was committed by a member of the figure moe zoku even before his arrest.

Not all attention has been negative. In his book, Hiroki Azuma observed: "Between 2001 and 2007, the  forms and markets quite rapidly won social recognition in Japan", citing the fact that "[i]n 2003, Hayao Miyazaki won the Academy Award for his Spirited Away; around the same time Takashi Murakami achieved recognition for -like designs; in 2004, the Japanese pavilion in the 2004 International Architecture exhibition of the Venice Biennale (Biennale Architecture) featured . In 2005, the word  - one of the keywords of the present volume - was chosen as one of the top ten "buzzwords of the year." The former Prime Minister of Japan Taro Aso has also claimed to be an otaku, using this subculture to promote Japan in foreign affairs. This study suggests that the stigma of the word has vanished, and the term has been embraced by many. Marie Kondo told ForbesWomen in 2020: "I credit being an otaku with helping me to focus deeply, which definitely contributed to my success."

Places
Akihabara also has dozens of stores specializing in anime, manga, retro video games, figurines, card games and other collectibles. Another popular location is Otome Road in Ikebukuro, Tokyo. In Nagoya, students from Nagoya City University started a project on ways to help promote hidden tourist attractions related to the  culture to attract more  to the city.

Subtypes

Media
 often participate in self-mocking through the production or interest in humor directed at their subculture. Anime and manga  are the subject of numerous self-critical works, such as Otaku no Video, which contains a live-interview mockumentary that pokes fun at the  subculture and includes Gainax's own staff as the interviewees. Works that focus on an  character include WataMote, the story of an unattractive and unsociable otome game  who exhibits delusions about her social status; and No More Heroes, a video game about an otaku assassin named Travis Touchdown and his surrealistic adventures inspired by anime and manga. Media about otaku also exist outside of Japan, such as the American documentary Otaku Unite! which focuses on the American side of the  culture, and the Filipino novel Otaku Girl which tells the story of a virtual reality world where otaku can role-play and use the powers of their favorite anime characters.

Types

The Nomura Research Institute (NRI) has made two major studies into , the first in 2004 and a revised study with a more specific definition in 2005. The 2005 study defines twelve major fields of  interests. Of these groups, manga (Japanese comics) was the largest, with 350,000 individuals and ¥83 billion market scale. Idol  were the next largest group, with 280,000 individuals and ¥61 billion. Travel  with 250,000 individuals and ¥81 billion. PC  with 190,000 individuals and ¥36 billion. Video game  with 160,000 individuals and ¥21 billion. Automobile  with 140,000 individuals and ¥54 billion. Animation (anime)  with 110,000 individuals and ¥20 billion. The remaining five categories include Mobile IT equipment , with 70,000 individuals and ¥8 billion; Audio-visual equipment , with 60,000 individuals and ¥12 billion; camera , with 50,000 individuals and ¥18 billion; fashion , with 40,000 individuals and ¥13 billion; and railway , with 20,000 individuals and ¥4 billion. These values were partially released with a much higher estimation in 2004, but this definition focused on the consumerism and not the "unique psychological characteristics" of  used in the 2005 study.

The first is the family-oriented , who has broad interests and is more mature than other ; their object of interest is secretive and they are "closet ". The second is the serious "leaving my own mark on the world" , with interests in mechanical or business personality fields. The third type is the "media-sensitive multiple interest" , whose diverse interests are shared with others. The fourth type is the "outgoing and assertive ", who gain recognition by promoting their hobby. The last is the "fan magazine-obsessed ", which is predominately female with a small group of males being the "moe type"; the secret hobby is focused on the production or interest in fan works. The Hamagin Research Institute found that moe-related content was worth ¥88.8 billion ($807 million) in 2005, and one analyst estimated the market could be as much as ¥2 trillion ($18 billion).

Other classifications of  interests include Vocaloid, cosplay, figures and professional wrestling as categorized by the Yano Research Institute. Yano Research reports and tracks market growth and trends in sectors heavily influenced by  consumerism. In 2012, it noted around 30% of growth in dating sim and online gaming , while Vocaloid, cosplay, idols and maid services grew by 10%, confirming its 2011 predictions.

Ōkina otomodachi 
 is a Japanese phrase that literally means "a big friend" or "an adult friend". Japanese otaku use it to describe themselves as adult fans of an anime, a manga, or a TV show that is originally aimed at children. Note that a parent who watches such a show with his or her children is not considered an ōkina otomodachi. An ōkina otomodachi is not a parent who buys anime DVDs for his or her children to watch. Ōkina otomodachi are those who buy children's anime for themselves.  Also, if the work is obviously aimed at adults, a fan of it is not an ōkina otomodachi. Hence ōkina otomodachi and otaku are different concepts.

See also

 Akiba-kei
 Daicon III and IV Opening Animations
 Hikikomori
 Japanophile
 Japanification
 Nijikon
 Hentai

References

Works cited

External links

 "I'm alone, but not lonely" – an early article about Japanese otaku, December 1990
https://www.academia.edu/35783297/Léthique_otaku_Tous_seuls_ensemble_la_crise_de_contact_et_autres_troubles_des_sens_1999 Article in French by Maurice Benayoun
 The Politics of Otaku – a general commentary on the usage and meanings of "otaku" in Japan and internationally, September 2001
 An Introduction to Otaku Movement, paper by Thomas Lamarre
 Meet the Geek Elite, Wired Magazine, July 2006
 Michael Manfé – Otakismus 

 
Fandom
English-language slang
Japanese slang
Japanese values
1983 neologisms
Epithets related to nerd culture